The Belle of Broadway is a 1926 American silent romantic drama film produced and distributed by Columbia Pictures. It was directed by Harry O. Hoyt and starred Betty Compson.

This film is preserved in the Library of Congress collection.

Cast
Betty Compson as Marie Duval
Herbert Rawlinson as Paul Merlin
Edith Yorke as Madame Adele
Armand Kaliz as Count Raoul de Parma
Ervin Renard -
Max Barwyn - 
Albert Roccardi - 
Edward Warren - 
Tom Ricketts -
Edward Kipling - 
Wilfrid North -
August Tollaire -

References

External links

AllMovie.com/synopsis
Period lobby poster
Lobby poster

1926 films
American silent feature films
Films directed by Harry O. Hoyt
Columbia Pictures films
1926 romantic drama films
American romantic drama films
Surviving American silent films
American black-and-white films
1920s American films
Silent romantic drama films
Silent American drama films